The United Progressive Party (UPP) is a political party in Saint Vincent and the Grenadines. The party was formed on 2 January 2020.  Its ideology centers on progressivism and decentralization. They had planned to contest the 2020 Vincentian general election, but suspended their campaign on 3 October. Mark J.N Doyle, the party chair, announced that the UPP would contest in 2025 instead; for 2020, he expressed support for the New Democratic Party over the incumbent Unity Labour Party. Their logo is heavily influenced by that of the Jamaica Labour Party.

Party Color
 
United Progressive Party changed its party color from purple to blue on 15 October 2020. This was announced by the parties president.

References

Political parties established in 2020
Politics of Saint Vincent and the Grenadines
Political parties in Saint Vincent and the Grenadines
Republicanism in Saint Vincent and the Grenadines
Right-wing parties in North America